Sadegh, or accented Sādegh (in ), is an Iranian name and variant of Sadeq.

Given name
Sadegh Aliakbarzadeh (born 1932), Iranian boxer
Sadegh Amirazizi (1905–1992), Iranian army general and politician 
Sadegh Gashni (born 1986), Iranian footballer
Sadegh Ghotbzadeh (1936–1982), Iranian close aide of Ayatollah Khomeini foreign minister during the Iran hostage crisis following the Iranian Revolution and executed in 1982 for allegedly plotting the assassination of Ayatollah Khomeini and the overthrow of the Islamic Republic
Sadegh Goudarzi (born 1987), Iranian wrestler
Sadegh Hedayat (1903–1951), Iranian writer, translator, and intellectual
Sadegh Karamyar (born 1959), Iranian writer, journalist, screenwriter, and film director
Sadegh Khalkhali (1926–2003), Shia cleric of the Islamic Republic of Iran who is said to have "brought to his job as Chief Justice of the revolutionary courts a relish for summary execution" that earned him a reputation as Iran's "hanging judge"
Sadegh Kharazi (born 1963), Iranian diplomat and advisor to Iran's former President Khatami
Sadegh Mahsouli (born 1959), Iranian politician and government minister
Sadegh Moharrami (born 1996), Iranian footballer
Sadegh Najafi-Khazarlou, Iranian politician and mayor of Tabriz
Sadegh Nezam-mafi (1925–2009), Iranian physician and a pioneer of nuclear medicine in Iran
Sadegh Nojouki (born 1950), Iranian pop and classical musician, composer, songwriter, arranger
Sadegh Malek Shahmirzadi (born 1940), Iranian archaeologist and anthropologist
Sadegh Sharafkandi (1938–1992), Kurdish politician and the Secretary-General of the Kurdistan Democratic Party of Iran
Sadegh Choubak (1916–1998), Iranian author of short fiction, drama, and novels
Sadegh Vahedi, (born 1991) Iranian rapper
Sadegh Varmazyar, Iranian footballer
Sadegh Vaez-Zadeh (born 1959), Iranian professor and academician
Sadegh Zharfani, Iranian footballer
Sadegh Zibakalam (born 1948), Iranian academic, author and pundit
Sadegh Lajevardi (born 1987), Iranian academic, author and researcher

Middle name
Mohammad Sadegh Barani (born 1991), Iranian footballer
Mohammad Sadegh Karami (born 1984), Iranian footballer
Mohammad-Sadegh Salehimanesh, Iranian cleric and politician

Surname
Habib Sadegh, Tunisian football manager
Sadegh Sadegh, Iranian diplomat and constitutionalist politician

See also
Sadeq (disambiguation)
12572 Sadegh, a minor planet. See Meanings of minor planet names: 12001–13000#572
Sadek (disambiguation)
Sadiq (disambiguation)
Siddiq (name)
Siddique (disambiguation)